Meade Hill is a mountain in Schoharie County, New York. It is located southeast of Charlotteville. Wayman Hill is located southwest and Mount Jefferson is located southeast of Meade Hill.

References

Mountains of Schoharie County, New York
Mountains of New York (state)